Vincenzo 'Enzo' Maresca (born 10 February 1980) is an Italian  former footballer who played as a midfielder, and a current coach.

After starting out at West Bromwich Albion in 1998, he went on to play for several clubs in his country, including Juventus, who loaned him twice for the duration of his contract, and with whom he won the league title in 2002. After being released in 2004, he went to play one season with Fiorentina; he then resumed his career in La Liga with Sevilla (where he remained for four years) and Málaga, appearing in 134 games and scoring 17 goals in the competition whilst winning five major titles with the former side; in between his two spells in Spain he also spent one year in Greece with Olympiacos, later returning to Italy in 2012, where he played until his retirement in 2017, totalling 140 appearances and 17 goals in Serie A.

Maresca represented Italy at youth level, including the Italy under-21 team, but was never capped at senior level.

Club career

Early years
Born in Pontecagnano Faiano, Province of Salerno, Maresca started playing football at the age of 11 with A.C. Milan, joining Cagliari Calcio after three years.

He made his senior debut with West Bromwich Albion in a 0–2 home defeat against Bradford City on 20 September 1998, played two incomplete seasons with the English club in the Football League First Division.

Juventus
In January 2000, Maresca moved back to Italy and joined Juventus F.C. in a transfer worth £4.3 million, a club record sale for Albion at the time. He played in only one Serie A game until the end of the season.

For two of the following three seasons, Maresca was loaned to fellow league teams Bologna F.C. 1909 and Piacenza Calcio – co-ownershp deal in the latter case – scoring nine goals in 2002–03 but suffering team relegation. During the previous campaign, he notably netted an important equaliser in the Derby della mole return leg, against neighbouring Torino FC; he attracted controversy, however, when he celebrated the goal by mimicking Torino's Marco Ferrante's earlier "Bull-horn" goal celebration (the bull being a club symbol as it is Turin's coat of arms, and the side also being known in its contracted form as "Toro", bull in Italian). Juventus subsequently bought the remaining 50% of his rights for €2.6 million.

Fiorentina
In the 2004 summer, ACF Fiorentina signed Maresca along with Fabrizio Miccoli and Giorgio Chiellini for €13 million, with Juventus holding half of the players' rights. He made his official debut on 12 September, playing 60 minutes in a 0–1 away loss against A.S. Roma.

At the end of the season, with the Viola narrowly avoiding top level relegation, Juventus bought back all three for about €6.7 million in a blind auction between the clubs. Maresca's cost was of only about €7,000, but an additional €420,000 agent fee in order to keep the player was also involved.

Sevilla
On 16 July 2005, Maresca moved to Sevilla FC in Spain, for a transfer fee of €2.5 million and four years. He quickly emerged as a key player for his new club, and finished his first season in La Liga with 29 games and eight goals, adding 11/3 in the side's victorious campaign in the UEFA Cup, including two in the final against Middlesbrough (4–0) where he was also named Man of the match, donating the €10,000 prize money to the San Juan de Dios hospital in Seville.

Maresca played 45 minutes in the 2007 UEFA Cup Final in Glasgow's Hampden Park, as Sevilla successfully defended its European title, against RCD Espanyol. He appeared in an average of 22 league matches in his last three years combined.

Olympiacos
On 13 July 2009, Maresca transferred to Olympiacos F.C. from Greece in a three-year deal. He scored in his Superleague debut, a 2–0 win at Larissa FC, and appeared regularly during the 2009–10 campaign as the Piraeus-based club finished in second position.

Málaga
After terminating his contract with Olympiacos in August 2010, Maresca trained with former club Fiorentina in order to maintain match fitness. On 7 December, it was announced that he had been in talks with Málaga CF; after undergoing a medical examination, he signed with the Andalusians until June 2012.

Maresca made his league debut for his new team on 8 January 2011, playing 57 minutes in a 1–1 home draw against Athletic Bilbao. On 7 May, he contributed with one goal to the team's 3–0 success at Atlético Madrid.

Maresca appeared in 19 matches in 2011–12 (nine starts, two goals) as his team finished in fourth position and qualified for the UEFA Champions League for the first time in its history.

Return to Italy
On 2 July 2012, as his contract was about to expire, Maresca signed a new one-year link with Málaga. On 30 August, however, he returned to his country after seven years, joining U.C. Sampdoria for free.

Maresca scored his second goal of the season through a bicycle kick, but in a 1–2 home loss against Atalanta B.C. on 4 November 2012. In January 2014, after having featured rarely in the first half of the new campaign, he agreed on a return to the Serie B and joined league leaders U.S. Città di Palermo, who were in need of a playmaker. After contributing to the team's championship conquest, on 15 September 2014 he underwent an operation due to acute appendicitis, and the following January he signed a contract extension to keep him at the club until 2016.

On 15 May 2016, in the last matchday, Maresca scored in a 3–2 home win over Hellas Verona F.C. to help save his team from relegation. In September, the free agent joined the opposition who in turn had dropped down a level.

On 13 January 2017, Maresca terminated his contract with Verona. On 10 February, the day of his 37th birthday, he announced his retirement via his personal Instagram profile, after a footballing career which spanned nearly twenty years.

International career
Maresca was selected by the Italy under-20 team for the 2000 Toulon Tournament, and finished runner-up with the under-18s in the 1999 UEFA European Championship.

He also represented the under-21 side for two years between 2000 and 2002, although he missed the 2002 UEFA European Championship tournament in Switzerland due to injury as the nation went on to reach the semi-finals of the tournament. Despite his club success, in particular during his time with Sevilla, he was never capped at full level.

Style of play
A versatile, consistent, fast, energetic and hardworking player, Maresca was capable of playing anywhere in midfield; although he was often deployed as a deep-lying playmaker, due to his ability to orchestrate his team's offensive moves and create goalscoring opportunities, his preferred position was in a box-to-box role, either as a central or attacking midfielder, where he often demonstrated his offensive capabilities, eye for goal and adeptness at making late attacking runs into the penalty area. He was also capable of playing as a mezzala. A quick, dynamic and creative player, with good movement, technique and composure on the ball, he possessed good vision, awareness, tactical intelligence and passing ability; due to his physical and mental attributes, as well as his stamina, tenacity and work-rate, he was also competent defensively.

Because of his talent and wide range of skills, Maresca's former Fiorentina manager Emiliano Mondonico described him as a "complete player".

Managerial career
On 1 June 2017, Maresca was unveiled as part of the non-playing staff of second division club Ascoli Picchio F.C. 1898 for the upcoming season. As he did not have the required coaching badges by the time of the hiring, he was officially appointed as assistant to new head coach Fulvio Fiorin, formerly a youth manager and scout for Milan.

In August 2020 he was hired by Manchester City as manager of their Elite Development Squad team. After winning the Premier League 2 title with Manchester City, on 27 May 2021 he was hired as the new head coach of Parma, who will play Serie B in the 2021–22 season.

Despite a team including former international stars such as Gianluigi Buffon and Franco Vázquez, Maresca failed in leading Parma into the promotion spots, being eventually dismissed on 23 November 2021. In June 2022 he returned to Manchester City as Pep Guardiola’s assistant manager, replacing Juanma Lillo who became manager of Al-Sadd.

Managerial statistics

Honours

Player

Club
Juventus
Serie A: 2001–02
Supercoppa Italiana: 2003

Sevilla
Copa del Rey: 2006–07
Supercopa de España: 2007
UEFA Cup: 2005–06, 2006–07
UEFA Super Cup: 2006

Palermo
Serie B: 2013–14

Manager

Club
Manchester City Under-23
Premier League 2: 2020–21

References

External links

National team data  

1980 births
Living people
People from the Province of Salerno
Footballers from Campania
Italian footballers
Association football midfielders
English Football League players
West Bromwich Albion F.C. players
Serie A players
Serie B players
A.C. Milan players
Cagliari Calcio players
Juventus F.C. players
Bologna F.C. 1909 players
Piacenza Calcio 1919 players
ACF Fiorentina players
U.C. Sampdoria players
Palermo F.C. players
Hellas Verona F.C. players
La Liga players
Sevilla FC players
UEFA Cup winning players
Málaga CF players
Super League Greece players
Olympiacos F.C. players
Italy under-21 international footballers
Italy youth international footballers
Italian expatriate footballers
Expatriate footballers in England
Expatriate footballers in Spain
Expatriate footballers in Greece
Italian expatriate sportspeople in Greece
West Ham United F.C. non-playing staff
Expatriate football managers in England
Italian football managers
Parma Calcio 1913 managers
Serie B managers
Manchester City F.C. non-playing staff